Jocelyn Ahouéya (born 19 December 1985) is a Beninese footballer. He last played for SC Schiltigheim.

Career
Ahouéya began his career in the youth side for Mogas 90 FC and signed in summer 2004 for FC Sion.

International career
He was part of the Beninese 2004 African Nations Cup team, who finished bottom of their group in the first round of competition, thus failing to secure qualification for the quarter-finals. He also played at the 2005 FIFA World Youth Championship in the Netherlands.

Honours 
Sion
Swiss Cup: 2008–09

References

External links
 

1985 births
Living people
Beninese footballers
Benin international footballers
Beninese expatriate footballers
2004 African Cup of Nations players
2008 Africa Cup of Nations players
2010 Africa Cup of Nations players
FC Sion players
RC Strasbourg Alsace players
AS Beauvais Oise players
Championnat National players
Expatriate footballers in Switzerland
People from Abomey
Association football midfielders
Mogas 90 FC players